Zapryan Ivanov Rakov (born 4 January 1962, in Manole) is a former Bulgarian international football player.

External links

Bulgarian footballers
1962 births
Living people
Bulgaria international footballers
Botev Plovdiv players
FC Maritsa Plovdiv players
First Professional Football League (Bulgaria) players
Association football defenders